The 2008 North West 200 took place on Saturday 17 May at the 8.966 mile circuit, dubbed "The Triangle", based around the towns of Coleraine, Portrush and Portstewart, in Northern Ireland. The meeting was overshadowed by the death of Northern Irish rider Robert Dunlop, the record-holder for wins at the circuit, who was killed in a practice crash on 15 May. The 47-year-old had been travelling in a group of three riders at the Mather's Cross section of the course, when his bike seized at 160 mph. He would later succumb to his injuries in a Coleraine hospital. Robert's sons Michael and William continued to race at the meeting, with Michael winning the 250cc race.

Practice 
John McGuinness dominated qualifying for the 250cc race, the first to be contested on race day. McGuinness went round the 8.966 mile circuit in a time of 4'57.791, the only rider to break five minutes and qualified on pole by over 3 seconds from the Hondas of Michael Dunlop and Paul Robinson. Hondas took the first eight places on the grid, with Henrik Voit's Aprilia the best non-Honda in ninth. McGuinness also dominated Superbike practice, being fastest both on Tuesday and on Thursday. Having achieved a 4'25.377 on Tuesday, he lowered that mark by over 3 seconds to a 4'22.342 on Thursday. Michael Rutter on the NW200-backed Ducati qualified 2nd on a 4'22.999, with the rest in the 4'24s or higher. This session sets the grid for both Superbike races. Steve Plater qualified on pole for the Supersport races, recording a lap of 4'33.749 on Thursday to put him half a second clear of Alastair Seeley, who qualified second, with Keith Amor qualifying 3rd, to give three different nations placed in the top three places. Amor would go two places better in the qualifying session for the Superstock race. In the fourth session, he set a time of 4'26.446, which would give him the pole by over 1.5 seconds. Seeley was second with his time of 4'28.029 coming in session three and Rutter was third, with a 4'28.138 set in session four. Michael Wilcox was the clear pacesetter in the 125cc qualifying, setting a pole lap of 5'17.528 and was on top by nearly three seconds from the Aprilia of David Lemon with the Hondas of Mark Curtin, Michael Dunlop and Chris Palmer rounding out the top five. Leo Aldersley's Yamaha was fastest in the 400cc session, which occurred at the same time as the 125cc session as those two races are contested in the one race, albeit separated on track. His 5'15.329 was almost three seconds faster than second placed qualifier and fellow Yamaha rider, Oliver Linsdell. Les Shand's Kawasaki was third, with the best Honda belonging to Manxman David Madsen-Mygdal lining up fourth.

Races

Race 1; 250cc Race final standings 
Saturday 17 May 2008 4 laps – 35.724 miles

Fastest Lap: Michael Dunlop, 4'51.975 on lap 4 (110.549 mph; 177.911 km/h)

Race 2; 1000cc Superbike Race final standings 
Saturday 17 May 2008 *5 laps – 44.690 miles

Fastest Lap: Michael Rutter, 4'20.729 on lap 5 (123.798 mph; 199.234 km/h)

Race 3; Supersport Race final standings 
Saturday 17 May 2008 5 laps – 44.690 miles

Fastest Lap and New Lap Record: Steve Plater, 4'30.792 on lap 5 (119.197 mph; 191.829 km/h)

Race 4; 125cc Race final standings
Saturday 17 May 2008 4 laps – 35.724 miles

Fastest Lap: Chris Palmer, 5'16.672 on lap 4 (101.928 mph; 164.037 km/h)

Race 5; 400cc Race final standings
Saturday 17 May 2008 4 laps – 35.724 miles

Fastest Lap and New Lap Record: Oliver Linsdell, 5'06.838 on lap 3 (105.194 mph; 169.293 km/h)

Race 6; 1000cc Superstock Race final standings
Saturday 17 May 2008 5 laps – 44.690 miles

Fastest Lap and New Lap Record: Guy Martin, 4'24.682 on lap 3 (121.949 mph; 196.258 km/h)

Race 7; North West 200 Superbike Race 
Saturday 17 May 2008 6 laps – 53.656 miles

Fastest Lap: John McGuinness (lap 5) and Steve Plater (lap 6), 4'21.686 (123.345 mph; 198.505 km/h)

Race 8; Supersport Race 
Saturday 17 May 2008 5 laps – 44.690 miles

Fastest Lap: Keith Amor, 4'31.745 on lap 4 (118.779 mph; 191.156 km/h)

External links 
 
 Map of "The Triangle"

2008
2008 in British motorsport
2008 in Northern Ireland sport
North